The Martinican Progressive Party (PPM) is a democratic socialist political party in Martinique. It was founded on March 22, 1958 by poet Aimé Césaire after breaking off from the French Communist Party. The party favours the autonomy of Martinique within France, unlike the nationalist Martinican Independence Movement (MIM). The party has one seat in the French National Assembly, currently held by Serge Letchimy, deputy from Fort-de-France (Martinique's 3rd constituency).

External links
 PPM official site

Political parties in Martinique
Political parties established in 1958
1958 establishments in France